Norman Anderson (born January 25, 1997) is a Belizean footballer who currently plays for Belmopan Bandits in the Premier League of Belize and the Belize national team.

International career 
Anderson made his national team debut for Belize on 4 June 2018 in a 0–0 draw against Barbados.

References 

1997 births
Living people
Belizean footballers
Belize international footballers
Premier League of Belize players
Association football defenders
Belmopan Bandits players